The 2022 New York Liberty season was the 26th season for the New York Liberty franchise of the WNBA. The Liberty opened the regular season on May 7, 2022, versus the Connecticut Sun.

Ahead of the season, the Liberty parted ways with head coach Walt Hopkins on December 6, 2021, after two years with the team. On January 7, 2022, the Liberty announced the hiring of new Head Coach Sandy Brondello

On May 3, 2022, the Liberty announced that 1st Round draft pick Nyara Sabally had undergone a successful Osteochondral Autograft Transplantation and would miss the entire 2022 season.

The Liberty won their first game of the season but their quick start did not last long.  They went on a seven game losing streak after their opening day win to finish May 1–7.  The Liberty were able to turn things around in June, finishing the month 7–4 and seeming to develop a pattern of winning two games and then losing one.  That pattern occurred three times in the month.  That streak did not last into July as the team went 3–7 in the month and had a six game losing streak.  To finish an up-and-down season, they went 5–2 in August and secured the seventh seed in the 2022 WNBA Playoffs with a 16–20 overall record.  Their sixteen regular season wins was the franchise's most since they won twenty two games in 2017.

As the seventh seed, the Liberty were matched up against the second seed Chicago Sky in the First Round of the playoffs, with Chicago having home court advantage.  That advantage did not last long as the Liberty won the opening game of the series 98–91.  The Liberty wouldn't build on that momentum and lost the next two games, including the series decider at home, by a combined fifty-six points.

Transactions

WNBA Draft

Trades and Roster Changes

Roster

Depth

Schedule

Preseason

|- style="background:#ccc;"
| 1
| April 30
| Washington
| colspan=4 | Canceled
| Barclays Center
| 0–0

Regular Season

|- style="background:#cfc;"
| 1
| May 7
| Connecticut
| W 81–79
| Sabrina Ionescu (25)
| Natasha Howard (6)
| Sabrina Ionescu (6)
| Barclays Center6,829
| 1–0
|- style="background:#fcc;"
| 2
| May 11
| @ Chicago
| L 50–83
| Han Xu (10)
| DolsonIonescu (6)
| Betnijah Laney (6)
| Wintrust Arena4,935
| 1–1
|- style="background:#fcc;"
| 3
| May 13
| Indiana
| L 86–92 (OT)
| Sabrina Ionescu (31)
| Natasha Howard (9)
| Sabrina Ionescu (7)
| Barclays Center3,289
| 1–2
|- style="background:#fcc;"
| 4
| May 15
| Dallas
| L 71–81
| Sabrina Ionescu (17)
| Natasha Howard (8)
| Sabrina Ionescu (6)
| Barclays Center3,095
| 1–3
|- style="background:#fcc;"
| 5
| May 17
| Connecticut
| L 65–92
| Betnijah Laney (16)
| Stefanie Dolson (7)
| Sabrina Ionescu (4)
| Barclays Center3,054
| 1–4
|- style="background:#fcc;"
| 6
| May 24
| @ Minnesota
| L 78–84
| Natasha Howard (23)
| Sabrina Ionescu (9)
| Sami Whitcomb (9)
| Target Center6,104
| 1–5
|- style="background:#fcc;"
| 7
| May 27
| @ Seattle
| L 71–79
| Natasha Howard (19)
| Natasha Howard (9)
| Sami Whitcomb (8)
| Climate Pledge Arena10,001
| 1–6
|- style="background:#fcc;"
| 8
| May 29
| @ Seattle
| L 61–92
| Han Xu (13)
| Han Xu (8)
| Sabrina Ionescu (4)
| Climate Pledge Arena10,228
| 1–7
|-

|- style="background:#cfc;"
| 9
| June 1
| Indiana
| W 87–74
| Sabrina Ionescu (23)
| Stefanie Dolson (8)
| Stefanie Dolson (7)
| Barclays Center4,079
| 2–7
|- style="background:#cfc;"
| 10
| June 3
| @ Washington
| W 74–70
| Sabrina Ionescu (24)
| Stefanie Dolson (8)
| Crystal Dangerfield (4)
| Entertainment and Sports Arena3,857
| 3–7
|- style="background:#fcc;"
| 11
| June 5
| Minnesota
| L 77–84
| Sabrina Ionescu (31)
| Michaela Onyenwere (6)
| Sabrina Ionescu (7)
| Barclays Center4,119
| 3–8
|- style="background:#cfc;"
| 12
| June 7
| Minnesota
| W 88–69
| Sabrina Ionescu (26)
| Sabrina Ionescu (8)
| Sabrina Ionescu (8)
| Barclays Center3,196
| 4–8
|- style="background:#cfc;"
| 13
| June 10
| @ Indiana
| W 97–83
| Natasha Howard (25)
| Natasha Howard (10)
| Sabrina Ionescu (7)
| Indiana Farmers Coliseum1,393
| 5–8
|- style="background:#fcc;"
| 14
| June 12
| Chicago
| L 86–88
| Sabrina Ionescu (27)
| Sabrina Ionescu (13)
| Sabrina Ionescu (12)
| Barclays Center4,810
| 5–9
|- style="background:#cfc;"
| 15
| June 16
| Washington
| W 77–65
| Natasha Howard (27)
| Natasha Howard (9)
| Sabrina Ionescu (9)
| Barclays Center4,168
| 6–9
|- style="background:#fcc;"
| 16
| June 19
| Seattle
| L 72–81
| Marine Johannès (23)
| Natasha Howard (11)
| Sabrina Ionescu (10)
| Barclays Center6,859
| 6–10
|- style="background:#cfc;"
| 17
| June 22
| @ Connecticut
| W 81–77
| Stefanie Dolson (16)
| Sabrina Ionescu (11)
| Sabrina Ionescu (6)
| Mohegan Sun4,652
| 7–10
|- style="background:#cfc;"
| 18
| June 24
| @ Atlanta
| W 89–77
| Sabrina Ionescu (21)
| Natasha Howard (10)
| Sabrina Ionescu (8)
| Gateway Center Arena2,697
| 8–10
|- style="background:#fcc;"
| 19
| June 30
| Atlanta
| L 81–92 (OT)
| Stefanie Dolson (20)
| Sabrina Ionescu (13)
| Sabrina Ionescu (7)
| Barclays Center6,161
| 8–11
|-

|- style="background:#fcc;"
| 20
| July 3
| @ Los Angeles
| L 74–84
| Marine Johannès (17)
| Sabrina Ionescu (9)
| Sabrina Ionescu (8)
| Crypto.com Arena5,436
| 8–12
|- style="background:#cfc;"
| 21
| July 6
| @ Las Vegas
| W 116–107
| Sabrina Ionescu (31)
| Sabrina Ionescu (13)
| Sabrina Ionescu (10)
| Michelob Ultra Arena8,405
| 9–12
|- style="background:#fcc;"
| 22
| July 7
| @ Phoenix
| L 81–84
| Sabrina Ionescu (22)
| Sabrina Ionescu (10)
| Marine Johannès (6)
| Footprint Center6,158
| 9–13
|- style="background:#fcc;"
| 23
| July 12
| Las Vegas
| L 101–107
| Sabrina Ionescu (27)
| Natasha Howard (11)
| IonescuJohannès (5)
| Barclays Center5,201
| 9–14
|- style="background:#fcc;"
| 24
| July 14
| Las Vegas
| L 74–108
| Natasha Howard (19)
| Natasha Howard (9)
| Sabrina Ionescu (6)
| Barclays Center9,896
| 9–15
|- style="background:#fcc;"
| 25
| July 19
| @ Connecticut
| L 63–82
| Sabrina Ionescu (13)
| Stefanie Dolson (6)
| Sabrina Ionescu (4)
| Mohegan Sun Arena6,288
| 9–16
|- style="background:#fcc;"
| 26
| July 21
| @ Washington
| L 69–78
| Natasha Howard (17)
| Natasha Howard (10)
| Crystal Dangerfield (5)
| Capital One Arena7,431
| 9–17
|- style="background:#cfc;"
| 27
| July 23
| Chicago
| W 83–80
| Sabrina Ionescu (17)
| Natasha Howard (10)
| Sabrina Ionescu (9)
| Barclays Center6,926
| 10–17
|- style="background:#fcc;"
| 28
| July 29
| @ Chicago
| L 81–89
| Sabrina Ionescu (16)
| Natasha Howard (10)
| Sabrina Ionescu (6)
| Wintrust Arena6,924
| 10–18
|- style="background:#cfc;"
| 29
| July 31
| Phoenix
| W 89–69
| Natasha Howard (23)
| Natasha Howard (12)
| Sabrina Ionescu (16)
| Barclays Center6,433
| 11–18
|-

|- style="background:#cfc;"
| 30
| August 2
| Los Angeles
| W 102–73
| Sabrina Ionescu (31)
| Natasha Howard (11)
| Han Xu (8)
| Barclays Center4,891
| 12–18
|- style="background:#cfc;"
| 31
| August 3
| Los Angeles
| W 64–61
| Sabrina Ionescu (20)
| DolsonIonescu (8)
| Sabrina Ionescu (6)
| Barclays Center5,315
| 13–18
|- style="background:#fcc;"
| 32
| August 6
| @ Phoenix
| L 62–76
| Sabrina Ionescu (20)
| Stefanie Dolson (7)
| Sabrina Ionescu (5)
| Footprint Center11,724
| 13–19
|- style="background:#fcc;"
| 33
| August 8
| @ Dallas
| L 77–86
| Sabrina Ionescu (32)
| Sabrina Ionescu (7)
| Sabrina Ionescu (4)
| College Park Center3,036
| 13–20
|- style="background:#cfc;"
| 34
| August 10
| @ Dallas
| W 91–73
| Sami Whitcomb (15)
| Sabrina Ionescu (9)
| Sabrina Ionescu (7)
| College Park Center3,795
| 14–20
|- style="background:#cfc;"
| 35
| August 12
| @ Atlanta
| W 80–70
| Crystal Dangerfield (18)
| Natasha Howard (12)
| DangerfieldIonescu (6)
| Gateway Center Arena3,138
| 15–20
|- style="background:#cfc;"
| 36
| August 14
| Atlanta
| W 87–83
| N. HowardJohannes (18)
| Stefanie Dolson (12)
| Sabrina Ionescu (7)
| Barclays Center7,561
| 16–20
|-

Playoffs 

|- style="background:#cfc;"
| 1
| August 17
| @ Chicago
| W 98–91
| N. HowardIonescu (22)
| DolsonN. HowardIonescu (7)
| Marine Johannès (7)
| Wintrust Arena7,524
| 1–0
|- style="background:#fcc;"
| 2
| August 20
| @ Chicago
| L 62–100
| OnyenwereXu (10)
| IonescuXu (5)
| DolsonIonescuLaneyWhitcomb (3)
| Wintrust Arena7,732
| 1–1
|- style="background:#fcc;"
| 3
| August 23
| Chicago
| L 72–90
| Betnijah Laney (15)
| Natasha Howard (11)
| IonescuJohannès (4)
| Barclays Center7,837
| 1–2

Standings

Playoffs

Statistics

Regular Season

‡Waived/Released during the season
†Traded during the season
≠Acquired during the season

Playoffs

Awards and Honors

References

External links
The Official Site of the New York Liberty

New York Liberty seasons
New York Liberty
New York Liberty
New York Liberty